Louis Arthur Owen Halsey (born 1929) is an English composer, arranger and choral conductor.  He founded the Elizabethan Singers and the Louis Halsey Singers.

Career
Halsey was born in London in 1929 (or 1926 according to some sources).  He studied music at the University of Cambridge and sang in King's College Choir.

He founded the Elizabethan Singers in 1953, which continued until 1966; the Thames Chamber Choir in 1964; and in 1967 the Louis Halsey Singers.  These groups have sung in many first performances and have toured internationally. He has also conducted the Allegri Singers, a chamber vocal group specializing in 20th century music.

Halsey's professional posts have included the BBC (music producer), the University of Illinois (Professor of Music and Head of the Choral Department), the Royal Liverpool Philharmonic Choir (guest chorus master), and at Regent's University London, where he was Director of Music.

He has composed anthems and other church music.

References

Living people
1929 births
English choral conductors
British male conductors (music)
English male classical composers
21st-century British conductors (music)
21st-century British male musicians